= 1939–40 Plunket Shield season =

Cricket tournament in New Zealand

1939–40 Plunket Shield
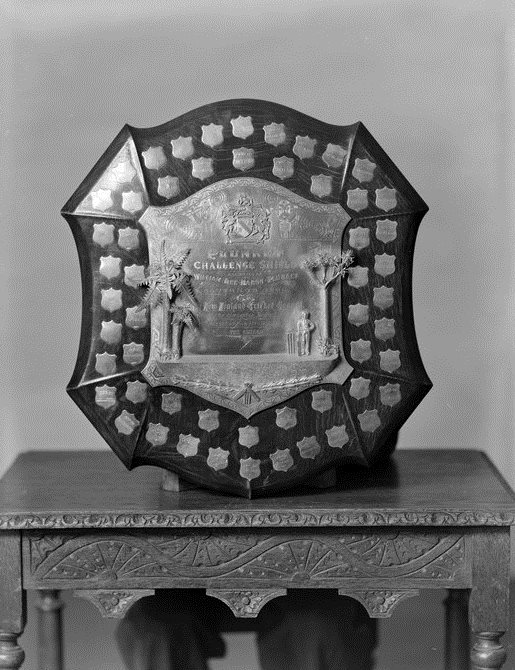
- The Plunket Shield trophy
- Cricket format: First-class
- Tournament format(s): Round-robin
- Champions: Auckland (8th title)
- Participants: 4
- Matches: 6

The 1939–40 Plunket Shield season was a tournament of the Plunket Shield, the domestic first-class cricket competition of New Zealand. It was the last season for six years until World War II had concluded.

Auckland won the championship, finishing at the top of the points table at the end of the round-robin tournament between the four first-class sides, Auckland, Canterbury, Otago and Wellington.

== Table ==
Below are the Plunket Shield standings for the season:

Team	Played	Won	Lost	Drawn	Points	NetRpW
Auckland	3	2	0	1	18	19.446
Canterbury	3	1	1	1	12	-1.980
Otago	3	1	1	1	10	-10.099
Wellington	3	0	2	1	4	-5.953
